Earl Joseph Evans II (November 11, 1955 – December 24, 2012) was a professional basketball forward who played one season in the National Basketball Association (NBA) as a member of the Detroit Pistons during the 1979–80 season. He attended University of Nevada, Las Vegas where he was selected by the Pistons during the eight round of the 1978 NBA draft.

External links

1955 births
2012 deaths
American men's basketball players
Basketball players from Texas
Detroit Pistons draft picks
Detroit Pistons players
Parade High School All-Americans (boys' basketball)
Power forwards (basketball)
Sportspeople from Port Arthur, Texas
UNLV Runnin' Rebels basketball players
USC Trojans men's basketball players